Kirovka may refer to:

Armenia
Mamai, Armenia, formerly known as Kirovka

Azerbaijan
Günəşli, Bilasuvar, known as Kirovka until 2005
Həsənsu, formerly known as Kirovka
Nağaraxana, formerly known as Kirovka
Yenikənd, Shamakhi, formerly known as Kirovka

See also

Kirov (disambiguation)
Kirovsk (disambiguation)
Kirovsky (disambiguation)